Westport High School may refer to:
 Westport High School (Massachusetts)
 Westport High School (Missouri)
 Westport High School (Kansas), now known as Westport Middle School
 Westport High School (Kentucky), now known as Westport Middle School
 Staples High School (Connecticut), located in Westport.

See also:
West Port High School